Hein Schumacher is a Dutch businessman, and the CEO-designate of Unilever.

Schumacher began his career at Unilever.

He has been CEO of the Dutch dairy co-operative FrieslandCampina since 2018. Before that, he worked at Heinz and was based in China for four years.

Schumacher has been a non-executive director of Unilever since October 2022. He is CEO of the Dutch dairy co-operative FrieslandCampina.

References

Living people

Year of birth missing (living people)
Dutch business executives
Unilever people
Dutch chief executives